In the 2019–20 season, FC Groningen played in the Eredivisie, the top tier of Dutch professional football, as well as the KNVB Cup.

Players

First-team squad

Out on loan

Player transfers

Players In

Players Out

Competitions

Club Friendlies

Eredivisie

Standings

Results summary

Matches

KNVB Cup

References

FC Groningen
FC Groningen seasons